A suction dredge can be:
 A type of ship or boat called a suction dredger
 An airlift (dredging device) for use underwater by divers